This List of University of Florida Olympians includes over 150 students and alumni of the University of Florida who have competed or coached in the Olympic Games, as well as current or former Florida Gators coaches who have coached in the Olympics.  The list includes such notable athletes as swimmer Tracy Caulkins, a three-time gold medalist, swimmer Ryan Lochte, a five-time gold medalist and winner of eleven medals, and distance runner Frank Shorter, a graduate of the College of Law and the first American to win an Olympic gold medal in the marathon.

Swimmer Catie Ball was the first University of Florida alumna to win an Olympic medal, but she did so while she was still a high school student and before she enrolled in the university.  Ball was a gold medalist in the 200-meter butterfly who later became the first head coach of the Florida Gators women's swimming and diving team while she was still a university undergraduate.  Swimmer Tim McKee was the first University of Florida alumnus to win an Olympic medal while he was still an undergraduate and a current member of a Florida Gators varsity sports team.  McKee won silver medals in the 200- and 400-meter individual medley events.

To date, the most successful Gator Olympian is Dara Torres, a twelve-time medalist and the first American swimmer to ever compete in five Olympics.

Baseball 

 Matthew LaPorta, American bronze medalist at 2008 Beijing Olympics
 Brad Wilkerson, American gold medalist at 2000 Sydney Olympics

Basketball 

 Tammy Jackson, American bronze medalist at 1992 Barcelona Olympics
 DeLisha Milton-Jones, American gold medalist at 2000 Sydney Olympics, gold medalist at 2008 Beijing Olympics

Beach volleyball 

 Gudula Staub, German team member at 2000 Sydney Olympics

Bobsled 

 John Amabile, Puerto Rican team member at 1992 Albertville Olympics, 1994 Lillehammer Olympics, and 1998 Nagano Olympics
 Liston Bochette, Puerto Rican team member at 1992 Albertville Olympics, 1994 Lillehammer Olympics, and 1998 Nagano Olympics
 Steve Mesler, American team member at 2002 Salt Lake City Olympics and 2006 Turin Olympics, and gold medalist at 2010 Vancouver Olympics

Cycling 

 Jeanne Golay, American team member at 1992 Barcelona Olympics and 1996 Atlanta Olympics
 Andrew Weaver, American team member at 1980 Moscow Olympics, and bronze medalist at 1984 Los Angeles Olympics

Diving 

 Debbie Fuller, Canadian team member at 1984 Los Angeles Olympics and 1988 Seoul Olympics
 Tom LeMaire, Belgian team member at 1984 Los Angeles Olympics
 Melisa Moses, American team member at 1996 Atlanta Olympics
 Megan Neyer, American team member, 1980 Moscow Olympics
 Chris Snode, British team member at 1976 Montreal Olympics, 1980 Moscow Olympics, and 1984 Los Angeles Olympics

Gymnastics 

 Anita Boten, Canadian team member at 1984 Los Angeles Olympics
 Marissa King, British team member at 2008 Beijing Olympics
 Christina McDonald, Canadian team member at 1988 Seoul Olympics
 Bridget Sloan, American silver medalist at 2008 Beijing Olympics
 Nicola Willis, British team member at 2004 Athens Olympics
 Lynette Wittmeier, Canadian team member at 1988 Seoul Olympics

Handball 

 Harry Winkler, American team member at 1972 Munich Olympics, 1976 Montreal Olympics, and 1984 Los Angeles Olympics

Judo 

 Colleen Rosensteel, American team member at 1992 Barcelona Olympics, 1996 Atlanta Olympics, and 2000 Sydney Olympics

Soccer 

 Melanie Booth, Canadian bronze medalist at the 2012 London Olympics
 Heather Mitts, American gold medalist at the 2004 Athens Olympics, 2008 Beijing Olympics, and 2012 London Olympics
 Abby Wambach, American gold medalist at the 2004 Athens Olympics and 2012 London Olympics

Swimming 

 Bradley Ally, Barbados team member at 2004 Athens Olympics and 2008 Beijing Olympics
 Theresa Andrews, American gold medalist at 1984 Los Angeles Olympics
 Duncan Armstrong, Australian gold medalist at 1988 Seoul Olympics
 Janelle Atkinson, Jamaican team member at 2000 Sydney Olympics and 2004 Athens Olympics
 Catie Ball, American gold medalist at 1968 Mexico City Olympics
 Jose Ballester, Spanish team member at 1988 Seoul Olympics and 1992 Barcelona Olympics
 Sarah Bateman, Iceland team member at 2008 Beijing Olympics and 2012 London Olympics
 Craig Beardsley, American team member qualified for 1980 Moscow Olympics
 Elizabeth Beisel, American team member at 2008 Beijing Olympics, silver medalist and bronze medalist at 2012 London Olympics
 Vipa Bernhardt, German team member at 2004 Athens Olympics
 Rosemary Brown, Australian team member at 1980 Moscow Olympics
 Tami Bruce, American team member at 1988 Seoul Olympics
 Carlton Bruner, American team member at 1996 Atlanta Olympics
 Caroline Burckle, American bronze medalist at 2008 Beijing Olympics
 Clark Burckle, American team member at 2012 London Olympics

 Rex Tullius, United States Virgin Islands team member at 2016 Rio Olympics

 Greg Burgess, American silver medalist at 1992 Barcelona Olympics, and team member at 1996 Atlanta Olympics
 Tracy Caulkins, American team member, qualified for 1980 Moscow Olympics, gold medalist at 1984 Los Angeles Olympics
 Matt Cetlinski, American gold medalist at 1988 Seoul Olympics
 Stephen Clarke, Canadian bronze medalist at 1992 Barcelona Olympics, and team member at 1996 Atlanta Olympics
 Melania Costa Schmid, Spanish team member at 2008 Beijing Olympics and 2012 London Olympics
 Emmanuel Crescimbeni, Peruvian team member at 2008 Beijing Olympics
 Troy Dalbey, American gold medalist at 1988 Seoul Olympics
 Rodion Davelaar, Netherlands Antilles team member at 2008 Beijing Olympics
 Frédéric Delcourt, French team member at 1980 Moscow Olympics, and silver medalist at 1984 Los Angeles Olympics
 Caeleb Dressel, American gold medalist at 2016 Rio Olympics and American gold medalist (5) at the 2020 Tokyo Olympics
 Nikki Dryden, Canadian team member at 1992 Barcelona Olympics and 1996 Atlanta Olympics
 Conor Dwyer, American gold medalist at the 2012 London Olympics
 Mercedes Farhat, Libyan team member at 2008 Beijing Olympics
 Bárbara Franco, Spanish team member at 1992 Barcelona Olympics and 1996 Atlanta Olympics
 Claudia Franco, Spanish team member at 1992 Barcelona Olympics and 1996 Atlanta Olympics
 Lisa Forrest, Australian team member at 1980 Moscow Olympics
 Brett Fraser, Cayman Islands team member at 2008 Beijing Olympics and 2012 London Olympics
 Shaune Fraser, Cayman Islands team member at 2004 Athens Olympics, 2008 Beijing Olympics and 2012 London Olympics
 Geoff Gaberino, American gold medalist at 1984 Los Angeles Olympics
 Balázs Gercsák, Hungarian team member at 2008 Beijing Olympics
 Chuy Gonzalez, Mexican team member at 1996 Atlanta Olympics
 Sandy Goss, Canadian silver medalist at 1984 Los Angeles Olympics, and silver medalist at 1988 Seoul Olympics
 Nicole Haislett, American gold medalist at 1992 Barcelona Olympics
 Beth Hazel, Canadian team member at 1992 Barcelona Olympics
 Mike Heath, American gold medalist and silver medalist at 1984 Los Angeles Olympics
 Whitney Hedgepeth, American team member at 1988 Seoul Olympics, gold medalist and silver medalist at 1996 Atlanta Olympics
 Jill Horstead, Canadian team member at 1984 Los Angeles Olympics
 Carlos Jayme, Brazilian bronze medalist at 2000 Sydney Olympics, and team member 2004 Athens Olympics
 Patrick Kennedy, American team member at 1984 Los Angeles Olympics
 Jane Kerr, Canadian team member at 1984 Los Angeles Olympics, and bronze medalist at 1988 Seoul Olympics
 Bryan Kim, South Korean team member at 1996 Atlanta Olympics, 2000 Sydney Olympics, and 2004 Athens Olympics
 Renee Laravie, American team member at 1976 Montreal Olympics
 David Larson, American team member, qualified for 1980 Moscow Olympics, and gold medalist at 1984 Los Angeles Olympics
 Nuno Laurentino, Portuguese team member at 2000 Sydney Olympics
 Enrico Linscheer, Surinamese team member at 1992 Barcelona Olympics and 1996 Atlanta Olympics
 Giovanni Linscheer, Surinamese team member at 1992 Barcelona Olympics and 1996 Atlanta Olympics
 Ryan Lochte, American gold medalist and silver medalist at 2004 Athens Olympics, gold medalist and bronze medalist at the 2008 Beijing Olympics, and gold, silver and bronze medalist at the 2012 London Olympics
 Alex Lopez, Puerto Rican team member at 1996 Atlanta Olympics, 2000 Sydney Olympics, and 2004 Athens Olympics
 Lea Loveless, American gold medalist and silver medalist at 1992 Barcelona Olympics
 Jemma Lowe, British team member at 2008 Beijing Olympics and 2012 London Olympics
 Corey Main, New Zealand team member at 2016 Rio Olympics
 Gabriel Mangabeira, Brazilian team member at 2004 Athens Olympics
 Leah Martindale, Barbados team member at 2000 Sydney Olympics
 Tim McKee, American silver medalist at 1972 Munich Olympics, and silver medalist at 1976 Montreal Olympics
 Steve Mellor, British team member at 1992 Barcelona Olympics
 Alberto Mestre, Venezuelan team member 1980 Moscow Olympics and 1984 Los Angeles Olympics
 Whitney Metzler, American team member at 1996 Atlanta Olympics
 Theresa Michalak, German team member at 2012 London Olympics
 Ricardo Monasterio, Venezuelan team member at 1996 Atlanta Olympics, 2000 Sydney Olympics, and 2004 Athens Olympics
 Mauricio Moreno, Colombian team member at 1996 Atlanta Olympics
 Anthony Nesty, Surinamese gold medalist at 1988 Seoul Olympics, and bronze medalist at 1992 Barcelona Olympics
 Omar Pinzón, Colombian team member at 2004 Athens Olympics and 2008 Beijing Olympics
 Anna-Liisa Põld, Estonian team member at 2008 Beijing Olympics
 Wendy Quirk, Canadian team member at 1976 Montreal Olympics
 Stephanie Richardson, Canadian team member at 1996 Atlanta Olympics
 Sebastien Rousseau, South African team member at the 2008 Beijing Olympics, 2012 London Olympics
 Roland Rudolf, Hungarian team member at 2008 Beijing Olympics
 Sinead Russell, Canadian team member at 2012 London Olympics
 Jon Sakovich, Guam team member at 1988 Seoul Olympics
 Bill Sawchuk, Canadian team member at 1976 Montreal Olympics, qualified for 1980 Moscow Olympics
 Adam Sioui, Canadian team member at 2008 Beijing Olympics
 Gemma Spofforth, British team member at 2008 Beijing Olympics and 2012 London Olympics
 Mark Stockwell, Australian silver medalist and bronze medalist at 1984 Los Angeles Olympics
 Ashley Tappin, American gold medalist at 1992 Barcelona Olympics, and gold medalist at 2000 Sydney Olympics
 Dara Torres, American gold medalist at 1984 Los Angeles Olympics, silver medalist and bronze medalist at 1988 Seoul Olympics, gold medalist at 1992 Barcelona Olympics, gold medalist and bronze medalist at 2000 Sydney Olympics, and silver medalist at 2008 Beijing Olympics
 Darian Townsend, South African gold medalist at 2004 Athens Olympics
 Rafael Vidal, Venezuelan team member at 1980 Moscow Olympics, and bronze medalist at 1984 Los Angeles Olympics
 Dana Vollmer, American gold medalist at 2004 Athens Olympics, and gold medalist at the 2012 London Olympics
 Allison Wagner, American silver medalist at 1996 Atlanta Olympics
 Janie Wagstaff, American gold medalist at 1992 Barcelona Olympics
 Laura Walker, American bronze medalist at 1988 Seoul Olympics
 J.B. Walsh, Filipino team member at 2004 Athens Olympics and 2008 Beijing Olympics
 Mary Wayte, American gold medalist at 1984 Los Angeles Olympics, and silver medalist and bronze medalist at 1988 Seoul Olympics
 Ashley Whitney, American team member at 1996 Atlanta Olympics
 Paige Zemina, American bronze medalist at 1988 Seoul Olympics
 David Zubero, Spanish team member at 1976 Montreal Olympics, bronze medalist at 1980 Moscow Olympics, team member at 1984 Los Angeles Olympics
 Martin Zubero, Spanish team member at 1988 Seoul Olympics, gold medalist at 1992 Barcelona Olympics, team member at 1996 Atlanta Olympics
 Katie Ledecky, American 6-time Olympic individual gold medalist and 14 world championship individual gold medalist, the most in history for a female swimmer. Volunteer coach at the University of Florida

Tennis 

 Jill Craybas, American team member at 2008 Beijing Olympics
 Jill Hetherington, Canadian team member at 1984 Los Angeles Olympics, 1988 Seoul Olympics, and 1996 Atlanta Olympics
 Mark Merklein, Bahamian team member at 2000 Sydney Olympics and 2004 Athens Olympics
 Lisa Raymond, American team member at 2004 Athens Olympics, bronze medalist at 2012 London Olympics

Track and field 

 John Amabile, Puerto Rican team member at 1992 Barcelona Olympics
 Aaron Armstrong, Trinidad and Tobago team member at 2008 Beijing Olympics
 Kim Barrett, Jamaican team member at 2004 Athens Olympics
 Liston Bochette, Puerto Rican team member at 1984 Los Angeles Olympics
Jack Batchler 1968 Mexico Olympics and 1972 Munich Olympics Team Member
 Mark Bradley, Canadian team member at 1984 Los Angeles Olympics
 Keith Brantly, American team member at 1996 Atlanta Olympics
 John Capel, American team member at 2000 Sydney Olympics and 2004 Athens Olympics
 Hazel Clark, American team member at 2000 Sydney Olympics and 2004 Athens Olympics
 Will Claye, American silver medalist and bronze medalist at 2012 London Olympics
 Kerron Clement, American gold medalist and silver medalist at 2008 Beijing Olympics
 Gerald Clervil, Haitian team member at 2000 Sydney Olympics
 Jeff Demps, American team member at 2012 London Olympics
 Mark Everett, American team member at 1988 Seoul Olympics, 1992 Barcelona Olympics, and 2000 Sydney Olympics
 Michelle Freeman, Jamaican team member at 1992 Barcelona Olympics, bronze medalist at 1996 Atlanta Olympics, and 2000 Sydney Olympics
 Erin Gilreath, American team member at 2004 Athens Olympics
 Kenneth Gray, Jamaican team member at 1984 Los Angeles Olympics
 Kristin Heaston, American team member at 2008 Beijing Olympics
 Grant Holloway, World Champion Hurdler 19,22, 20 Tokyo Silver medalist
 Anita Howard, American team member at 1992 Barcelona Olympics
 Moise Joseph, Haitian team member at 2008 Beijing Olympics
 Ron Jourdan, American team member at 1972 Munich Olympics
 Mariam Kevkhishvili, Georgian team member at 2004 Athens Olympics and 2008 Beijing Olympics
 Fletcher Lewis, Bahamian team member at 1976 Montreal Olympics
 Tony McQuay, American silver medalist at 2012 London Olympics
 Dan Middleman, American team member 1996 Atlanta Olympics in the 10,000 meter run
 Dennis Mitchell, American team member at 1988 Seoul Olympics, gold medalist and bronze medalist at 1992 Barcelona Olympics, silver medalist at 1996 Atlanta Olympics
 Tiandra Ponteen, Saint Kitts and Nevis team member at 2004 Athens Olympics
 Tom Pukstys, American team member at 1992 Barcelona Olympics and 1996 Atlanta Olympics
 Leroy Reid, Jamaican team member at 1984 Los Angeles Olympics
 Dionne Rose, Jamaican team member at 1992 Barcelona Olympics
 Candice Scott, Trinidad and Tobago team member at 2004 Athens Olympics
 Michael Sharpe, Bermuda team member at 1976 Montreal Olympics
 Frank Shorter, American gold medalist at 1972 Munich Olympics, and silver medalist at 1976 Montreal Olympics
 Calvin Smith Jr., American team member at 2008 Beijing Olympics
 Shelly Steely, American team member at 1992 Barcelona Olympics
 Christian Taylor, American gold medalist at 2012 London Olympics
 Derek Trafias, Polish team member at 2000 Sydney Olympics
 Horace Tuitt, Trinidad and Tobago team member at 1976 Montreal Olympics and 1996 Atlanta Olympics
 Bernard Williams, American gold medalist at 2000 Sydney Olympics, and silver medalist at 2004 Athens Olympics
 Novlene Williams, Jamaican bronze medalist at 2004 Athens Olympics, bronze medalist at 2008 Beijing Olympics, and bronze medalist at 2012 London Olympics
 Henry Kupczyk, Canadian team member at 1992 Barcelona Olympics and 2016 Rio Olympics Coach Dominica

Volleyball
 Kelly Murphy, American bronze medalist at 2016 Rio Olympics

Coaches

Swimming and diving 

 Ron Ballatore, assistant coach for Peru at 1968 Mexico City Olympics, assistant coach for Ecuador at 1972 Munich Olympics, assistant coach for Israel at 1976 Montreal Olympics, assistant coach for United States at 1984 Los Angeles Olympics and 1988 Seoul Olympics
 Rich DeSelm, assistant team manager for United States at 2000 Sydney Olympics
 Mitch Ivey, American silver medalist at 1968 Mexico City Olympics, bronze medalist at 1972 Munich Olympics, assistant coach for United States at 1988 Seoul Olympics
 Chris Martin, assistant coach for United States at 1992 Barcelona Olympics
 Anthony Nesty, Surinamese gold medalist at 1988 Seoul Olympics, head coach for Suriname at 2004 Athens Olympics
 Eddie Reese, assistant coach for United States at 1988 Seoul Olympics, head coach for United States at 1992 Barcelona Olympics and 2008 Beijing Olympics
 Randy Reese, assistant coach for United States at 1980 Moscow Olympics, 1984 Los Angeles Olympics and 1988 Seoul Olympics
 Gregg Troy, assistant coach for Guam at 1988 Seoul Olympics, assistant coach for Thailand at 1992 Barcelona Olympics, assistant coach for United States at 1996 Atlanta Olympics and 2008 Beijing Olympics; head coach for United States men's team at 2012 London Olympics
 Martyn Wilby, head coach for Barbados 2000 Sydney Olympics

Track and field 

 Jimmy Carnes, assistant coach for United States at 1976 Montreal Olympics, head coach for United States at 1980 Moscow Olympics
 Doug Brown, assistant coach for United States at 1996 Atlanta Olympics
Mike Holloway, assistant coach for the United States at 2012 London Olympics
 Larry Judge, assistant coach for Trinidad & Tobago at 2004 Athens Olympics
 Henry Kupczyk, assistant and head jumping coach at 2016 Rio Olympics for Dominica

See also 

 Florida Gators
 List of Florida Gators baseball players in Major League Baseball
 List of Florida Gators in the NFL Draft
 List of Florida Gators in the NBA
 List of Florida Gators men's golfers on the PGA Tour
 List of Florida Gators in the WNBA
 List of Florida Gators women's golfers on the LPGA Tour
 List of Florida Gators tennis players
 List of University of Florida alumni
 List of University of Florida Athletic Hall of Fame members

References

External links 
 Olympic History – List of University of Florida Olympians by GatorZone.com

Olympians
Olympians
Florida, University of
Florida, University of